The Battle of Gettysburg is a 1955 American documentary film about the Battle of Gettysburg during the American Civil War. The film was nominated for two Academy Awards.

The documentary was filmed in Cinemascope and Eastmancolor entirely on location at the Gettysburg National Military Park in south-central Pennsylvania. Leslie Nielsen provides narration, while songs from the Civil War era are played in the background with the sound effects of battle. At the end of the film, Nielsen reads the Gettysburg Address.

No actors appear onscreen. Memorial statues and bas-reliefs already present on the battlefield were photographed from various angles and distances, then the footage was juxtaposed to suggest that the static images were actual characters taking part in a dramatic re-enactment of the battle. In some scenes, the turbulence created by an off-screen helicopter is used to press down tall grasses, suggesting the passage of invisible soldiers.

In 1956, the film was nominated for Oscars for Best Documentary, Short Subject (Dore Schary) and Best Short Subject, Two-reel (also for Dore Schary).

See also
List of American films of 1955

References

External links
 

1955 films
American documentary films
Documentary films about the American Civil War
Metro-Goldwyn-Mayer short films
1955 documentary films
Battle of Gettysburg
Films directed by Herman Hoffman
1950s English-language films
1950s American films